Hastings Street is the fourth album from the Los Angeles-based band Brazzaville.  David Brown, the principal songwriter and vocalist wrote, "Hastings Street... is named after the infamous Hastings Street in Vancouver. It is basically the skid row of Vancouver, full of junkies and prostitutes. The title track on the CD was inspired by the life story of a guy I once met. There are several love songs on the record, including "Old Folks" and "It Only Hurts". There are also several stories about different characters.  "Londres" is the tale of a young girl growing up in East L.A. She is surrounded by poverty and violence. She listens to The Smiths and dreams of one day escaping to the promised land of Londres (London). "Love Is the Answer" is the story of an abused daughter who escapes to SF with her best friend. "Lagos Slums" is the story of a Nigerian man struggling to support his family in the New World of globalization." In reality, Hastings Street itself runs nearly twelve kilometers through two cities and to the locals less than two kilometers is considered "skid row".

Track listing
 "Intro"
 "Londres"
 "Love Is the Answer"
 "Old Folks"
 "Hong Kong Cafe"
 "Hastings Street"
 "Single Apartment"
 "Night Train to Moscow"
 "Interlude"
 'Lagos Slums"
 '17"
 'L.A. River Lady"
 'Left Out"
 'Asteroid Fields
 "Dark Eyes"
The album is currently unreleased in the US.

Brazzaville (American band) albums
2004 albums